Sleep the Season are a Canadian alternative pop music group formed in Welland in 2005. Their specialty is playing acoustic instruments only and using a cello.

History
Their first album Under Stars was released September, 5th 2005 and contained 5 songs. The Second album don't make a move was released September 4, 2006 and can be considered at the first long play album containing 13 songs.
Four Songs was released February 11, 2008 and was their first independent release.

The original band members are Ben Audet, Dave Fontaine, Greg Goertzen and Justin Fortier. According to the MySpace site of Sleep the Season the band has now five band members. Trevor Speechly is the new bass player and Mike Harris is their new drummer.

Sleep the Season announced that the band was ending (October 2009) and their final show would be December 27 at the Merchant Ale House in St. Catharines, Ontario. The show would also be the release of their final EP Anyone but You.

Controversy
It is widely regarded that the music video for Sleep the Season's 2007 hit, "The Waltz", was plagiarized by Miley Cyrus. In 2010, Cyrus released the official video for her song, "Can't Be Tamed" which included many similar themes and motifs. Fontaine has gone on record to accuse her of copying many elements of the video, including specific shots, stylistic choices, and narrative. Fontaine has reached out to various media outlets including TMZ, however they have not reported on the issue. Cyrus has yet to comment on the issue.

Band members
Final lineup 
Dave Fontaine – lead vocals
Greg Goertzen – cello
Justin Fortier – guitar
Trevor Speechly – bass guitar
Mike Harris - drums

Past members
Ben Audet  – drums, vocals

Discography

Awards

References

External links
Sleep the Season official website
Sutherland, Sam.  "Attack in Black—In Between Days", Exclaim!, August 2007.
The Waltz Music Video
Interview with Sleep the Season

Musical groups established in 2005
Musical groups disestablished in 2009
Musical groups from the Regional Municipality of Niagara
Welland
Canadian pop music groups
2005 establishments in Ontario
2009 disestablishments in Ontario